KCIW-LP is a low-power FM (LPFM) community radio station on 100.7 FM in Brookings, Oregon.

The station license is held by an Oregon non-profit community organization Curry Coast Community Radio that was incorporated to create and maintain the station. The group was granted an FCC construction permit in February 2014, and began broadcasting 1 January 2017.

The station is an affiliate of the syndicated Pink Floyd program "Floydian Slip."

See also
 low-power FM broadcasting (LPFM)
 Community radio
 List of community radio stations in the United States

References

External links
 
 

Community radio stations in the United States
Radio stations established in 2016
2016 establishments in Oregon
CIW-LP
CIW-LP